The 1995–96 Club Atlético Boca Juniors season was the 66th consecutive Primera División season played by the senior squad.

Summary
The campaign is best remembered by the high-expected return to the club of 1986 World Cup champion Diego Maradona after 14 seasons.  Several players were transferred in included Rosario Central left winger Kily González almost signed by Real Madrid, Darío Scotto, Claudio Paul Caniggia, Arturo Yorno and loans out ended for Raul Peralta, Roberto Cabañas y Blas Giunta.

On 3 December 1995 Mauricio Macri won his first Chairman's election with 7,000 votes and became new club President  In Torneo Apertura 1995 the squad finished on 4th spot after several rounds being leader losing the title over the last 5 matches.

Marzolini was sacked and Macri signed Carlos Bilardo during December 1995, and reinforced the squad with midfielders Juan Sebastián Verón from Estudiantes La Plata and José Horacio Basualdo. The Clausura is best remembered by the bizarre fact of 5 penalties missed by Maradona. The club finished on 5th spot with 33 points, seven below of champions Carlos Bianchi' Velez Sarsfield.

Squad

Transfers

January

Competitions

Torneo Apertura

League table

Position by round

Matches

Torneo Clausura

League table

Position by round

Matches

1995 Supercopa Libertadores

Preliminary round

Statistics

Players statistics

References

External links
 Club Atlético Boca Juniors official web site 

Boc
Club Atlético Boca Juniors seasons